The 2009 Rijeka Open was a professional tennis tournament played on outdoor red clay courts. It was the 3rd edition of the tournament which was part of the 2009 ATP Challenger Tour. It took place in Rijeka, Croatia between 29 June and 5 July 2009.

That was the last tournament for Mathieu Montcourt who died on 6 July 2009 in Boulogne-Billancourt. He played very well in Rijeka, reaching the semifinals where he lost to Blaž Kavčič. A police source said on 9 July 2009 after a preliminary autopsy that Mathieu suffered a cardiac arrest.

Singles entrants

Seeds

 Rankings are as of June 22, 2009.

Other entrants
The following players received wildcards into the singles main draw:
  Ivan Cerović
  Marcel Ružić
  Antonio Sančić
  Franko Škugor

The following players received entry from the qualifying draw:
  Pavol Červenák
  Nikola Ćirić
  Adrián García (as a Lucky Loser)
  Nikola Mektić
  Simone Vagnozzi

Champions

Singles

 Paolo Lorenzi def.  Blaž Kavčič, 6–3, 7–6(2)

Doubles

 Sebastián Decoud /  Miguel Ángel López Jaén def.  Ivan Dodig /  Antonio Veić, 7–6(7), 3–6, [10–8]

References
Official website
ITF Search 

Rijeka Open
Rijeka Open
Rijeka Open